Kobakhidze is a Georgian surname. It may refer to
Aleksandre Kobakhidze (born 1987), Georgian football player
Irakli Kobakhidze (born 1978), Georgian lawyer and politician
Mamuka Kobakhidze (born 1992), Georgian football player
Manana Kobakhidze (born 1968), Georgian lawyer and politician
Mikheil Kobakhidze (born 1939), Georgian screenwriter, film director, actor and composer